This is a list of the most common surnames in South America.

Argentina 
Most surnames are of Spanish, Italian, French, German, Irish, and Polish origin, in that order.

Brazil 
Most of the surnames of the Brazilian population have a Portuguese origin, due to Portuguese colonization in the country (it is estimated that 80% of the Brazilian population has at least one Portuguese ancestor), while other South American countries were largely colonized by the Spanish. However, due to historical immigration, there are also surnames of African, Arabic, German, Italian, Japanese, and Spanish origin. 2010 data:

Chile 
All surnames are Spanish in origin, with quite a few of them being Basque (e.g. Araya or Zúñiga).

Note: The source (Civil Registry and Identification Service) does not mention the reference year (it was published in 2008) or whether the count includes only the first surname or both surnames (Chile uses two surnames, but the second one is rarely mentioned). It is assumed the first table refers to both surnames (it is unknown if people having the same first and second surname are counted once or twice) and the second table to the first surname only. It is also unclear whether Chileans living abroad were counted, although it is probable that those that were born in Chile were included, as they were registered at birth.

Colombia 
All names in the list are of Spanish origin (2010 data).

Source: National Civil Registry (2010)

Paraguay 
The list of most common surnames in Paraguay, reflected in the national voters register, shows the influence of Castilian Spanish in the Paraguayan society.

Eight of the top 11 surnames end with "ez", the distinctive suffix of Castilian family names. The suffix "ez" means "son of"; thus, González means "son of Gonzalo", Benítez is "son of Benito" and Martínez means "son of Martín". This is similar to the suffix "son" in English (Johnson, "son of John", Jackson, "son of Jack") and to "ic" or "ich" of Slavic names such as Ivanovich ("son of Ivan").

All surnames are of Spanish origin, except when noted.

Peru
All surnames are of Spanish origin, except when noted.

Suriname

See also 

 List of family name affixes
 List of most popular given names
 Lists of most common surnames, for other continents

References 

South America
Surnames, most common
Surnames of South American origin
Surnames, common